, also known as KSS, is a television network headquartered in Kōchi City, Kōchi Prefecture, Japan. It is affiliated with FNN and FNS. Kochi Sun Sun Broadcasting is the third commercial television station in Kōchi. Former Kochi governor Daijiro Hashimoto played an important role for the establishment of Kochi Sun Sun Broadcasting.  It was started broadcast in 1997.  In 2006, KSS started digital television broadcasting.

References

External links
 website 

Fuji News Network
Television stations in Japan
Television channels and stations established in 1996
1996 establishments in Japan